The University of Cape Coast Hospital is located on the campus of the University of Cape Coast. The hospital provides services to both the university and the communities surrounding the university.

The hospital has several sections; the Out Patient Department (OPD), the Medical Laboratory, the Male and Female wards, and the Children's ward.

History 
The hospital started in 1962 as a clinic located close to the school's administration block.

References 

Hospitals in Ghana
Cape Coast
Hospitals established in 1962